The 2013–14 North Dakota State Bison men's basketball team represented North Dakota State University in the 2013–14 NCAA Division I men's basketball season. The Bison, led by seventh year head coach Saul Phillips, played their home games at the Bison Sports Arena and were members of The Summit League. They finished the season 26–7, 12–2 in The Summit League play to finish win The Summit League regular season championship. They were also champions of The Summit League tournament to earn an automatic bid to the NCAA tournament. In the NCAA Tournament, they defeated Oklahoma in the second round before losing to San Diego State in the round of 32.

At the end of the season, Saul Phillips resigned to take the head coaching job at Ohio. He was 134–84 in seven seasons. He was replaced by associate head coach David Richman.

Roster

Schedule

|-
!colspan=9 style=| Exhibition

|-
!colspan=9 style=| Regular season

|-
!colspan=9 style=| The Summit League tournament

|-
!colspan=9 style=| NCAA tournament

References

North Dakota State Bison men's basketball seasons
North Dakota State
North Dakota State
Bison
Bison